Lewis John Moir MacDougall (born 5 June 2002) is a Scottish film actor. He made his film debut in the fantasy film Pan (2015). He subsequently starred in the fantasy tragedy film A Monster Calls (2016), and the road trip drama film Boundaries (2018) and The belly of the whale (2018).

Early life
MacDougall was brought up in Edinburgh, Scotland. His father is a retired banker. His mother, Fiona, died in December 2013 from multiple sclerosis, and a few weeks after her death Lewis was cast as Nibs in the film Pan. Before his first film he had acted only in small parts at his local drama group, The Drama Studio, which specialised in improvised rather than scripted performances.

Career
MacDougall made his film debut in 2015 as Nibs in Pan, directed by Joe Wright, after attending an open audition in Morningside. In 2016, he starred in A Monster Calls, opposite Felicity Jones and Liam Neeson, and released on 23 December. In the film, a dark fantasy drama, he plays a boy whose mother is dying of a terminal illness, and who begins communicating with a tree monster seemingly living outside his house. On 6 October 2016, MacDougall attended the gala screening for A Monster Calls, at the BFI London Film Festival, where he was interviewed about his role. On 12 December, he appeared on BBC's The One Show, alongside co-star Liam Neeson, where he also talked about the film.

He then co-starred in the road trip comedy-drama Boundaries, opposite Vera Farmiga and Christopher Plummer, which premiered at South by Southwest in March 2018. In 2018 he also appeared as Lewis in the short film Multiplex.

Filmography

Television

Awards and nominations

References

External links
 

2002 births
Living people
Male actors from Edinburgh
Scottish male child actors
Scottish male film actors